Orange Bay may refer to:

Places 
 Canada
 Orange Bay (Newfoundland and Labrador)

 Chile
 Orange Bay, a bay in Hardy Peninsula, Hoste Island

 Jamaica
 Orange Bay (Hanover Parish)
 Orange Bay (Portland Parish)

Other uses 
 Orange Bay (horse) (foaled 1972), a thoroughbred racehorse and sire